OLBG is a sports betting community platform based in the United Kingdom.

History
OLBG (OnLine Betting Guide) was established in 2002 to guide UK bettors on where and how to place bets online in the early days of online betting. Between  2003 and 2004, a tipster competition and forum was added to the site and it grew to become the world’s biggest community of sports bettors who share their knowledge to help others improve their betting.

OLBG featured in the Road To Cheltenham series where it sponsored the OLBG Mares' Hurdle from 2012 to 2019, covered live on ITV.

In 2012, the OLBG Sports Betting Tips app was released to help users have easy access to the platform.

Services
OLBG shares  betting tips to help others improve their betting. The betting experience covers more than 20 sports, hundreds of leagues and thousands of events.

Awards
 2012 iGB Awards – Best Sportsbook Affiliate

 2013 iGB Awards – Best Affiliate (Overall)

 2015 iGB Affiliate Awards - Best Affiliate (Overall)

 SBC Awards 2017 - Best Affiliate Product Innovation – "Highly recommended"

See also
 David Nicholson Mares' Hurdle
 Wetherby Mares' Hurdle
 Cheltenham Festival
 Sports betting
 Sports betting systems
 Horse racing

References

Sports betting
Gambling websites
2002 establishments in the United Kingdom